Nkana FC is a football club based in Kitwe, Zambia. The football team is competing in the MTN/FAZ Super Division, and is regarded as one of the country's most popular teams. Nkana FC has won 13 League titles, which made it to be Zambia's most successful league club, and second overall behind Mufulira Wanderers, with 46 trophies. They play their home games at Nkana Stadium in Wusakile, Kitwe.

The club is currently sponsored by Mopani Copper Mines who are the major owners. The Football club has also acquired a Kit sponsorship deal with global online gambling company Betway.

However, controversies have surrounded the major sponsors of the club, in 2020 after the increase in the number of Covid-19 cases recorded in Zambia, the sponsors Mopani Copper Mines Plc reduced the sponsorship deal to the club by 50 percent citing the failing of the Copper prices due to the pandemic. The club decided to sign other sponsorship deals with The Zambia Revenue Authority and The Copperbelt University 

Nkana FC have one of the biggest fan base in Zambia, it's die hard fans used to be known for their noisy and passionate support of their club. Otherwise, Before the Launch of the 'Stop Hooliganism in football Campaign by the MTN/FAZ Super League Teams' Supporters Associations, it was always the tradition of the Nkana Fans to escalate violence especially after their team conceded a goal or Lost a football match in a questionable state of officiating the events which led to the Club being fined multiple times by the Zambian FA.

History
Nkana FC is one of Zambia’s oldest football clubs having been formed in 1935 in Kitwe's Wusakile township. The club was founded under the name of Rhokana United FC before it changed to Nkana Red Devils. In 1990, they were runners-up in the African Cup of Champions, the only Zambian team to ever reach the finals.

Nkana had a long history of success during the 1980s and early 1990s, winning nine league titles from 1982 to 1993. Coached by Moses Simwala, a number of prominent players ran out for Nkana during this time frame.

Nkana were Relegated from the top flight for the first time in their history in 2004, and their period in Division One was plagued by financial problems. However Nkana returned to the top flight after winning the 2007 Division One North title.

Over the years, Nkana have accumulated a record of success having won the MTN/FAZ Super League Thirteen times, most recently in 2020.

On 23 May 2014, head coach Masautso Mwale died in a road traffic accident on the eve of the home game against Séwé Sport of the Ivory Coast in the Group B in the 2014 CAF Confederation Cup. The accident occurred near Maposa area and his car overturned several times as he was driving back to join the team in camp in Kitwe.

Rivals
Apparently every team that plays in Zambia's top flight is a rival to Nkana FC but their Archrivals are Power Dynamos F.C. with whom they share the City with and the two teams are just separated by the Kitwe-Ndola dual carriage way. When the two teams meet, the city is divided & the winners in the Kitwe Derby or El Kopala get the city bragging rights.

Achievements
 African Cup of Champions Clubs Runners-up:
1990

 Zambian Premier League: 13
1982, 1983, 1985, 1986, 1988, 1989, 1990, 1992, 1993, 1999, 2001, 2013, 2020

 Zambian Cup: 6
1986, 1989, 1991, 1992, 1993, 2000

ABSA Cup: 1
2018

Zambian Charity Shield: 18
1982, 1983, 1984, 1985, 1987, 1989, 1990, 1991, 1993, 1994, 1995, 1996, 1997, 2000, 2014, 2018, 2019, 2020

Zambian Challenge Cup:  7
1964, 1966 (as Rhokana United)
1992, 1993, 1998, 1999, 2000

Heinrich Cup/Chibuku Cup/Heroes and Unity Cup: 5
1969, 1974, 1989, 1990, 1993

Zambian Champion of Champions Cup: 2
1986, 1993

Performance in CAF competitions
CAF Champions League: 3 appearances
2000 – Second Round
2002 – Second Round
2014 – Second Round

African Cup of Champions Clubs: 9 appearances

1983: Semi-Finals
1984: Quarter-Finals
1986: Semi-Finals

1987: Second Round
1989: Semi-Finals
1990: Finalist''

1991: Semi-Finals
1992: Quarter-Finals
1993: Quarter-Finals
1994: Semi-Finals

CAF Cup Winners' Cup: 2 appearances
1998 – Quarter-Finals
2001 – Second Round

CAF Cup: 1 appearance
1999 – Second Round

Former coaches
  Gaston Mutobo
  Jeff Butler
  Beston Chambeshi
  Jericho Shinde
  Moses Simwala (1980–93)
  Patrick Phiri (1997–02)
  Ben Bamfuchile
  Kenneth Malitoli (2007)
  Masauso Mwale (2013–14)
Zeddy Saileti
Manfred Chabinga

References

 
Football clubs in Zambia
Association football clubs established in 1932
1935 establishments in Northern Rhodesia
Kitwe